The Cymbalista Synagogue and Jewish Heritage Center is a cultural center and the main synagogue of Tel Aviv University. It was designed in 1996 by architect Mario Botta and constructed from 1997 to 1998. The patrons and namesakes were Paulette and Norbert Cymbalista.

Architecture
The floor plan of the building comprises approximately 800 m2. From a rectangular base rise two matching towers both square in plan and merging to circles at their highest points of 13.5 m. A rectangular lobby connects the two towers. The original architectural form of the towers is a realisation in stone of the geometrical squaring the circle. In each tower at the circular top is installed a square "canopy" which drapes natural light onto the walls of the hybrid cylinder and rectangle volume. These installations resemble the traditional Jewish wedding canopy, the chuppah, here permanent and poetically cast in light. The Torah Ark is partially lit by translucent onyx. An inscription in Hebrew above it reads, "שויתי יהוה לנגדי תמיד" or in English, "I have set the LORD always before me" from Psalms 16:8.

Architectural context
The Cymbalista Synagogue and Jewish Heritage Center was made early in a time when famous architects where designing many high profile buildings in Israel, and developing a form of creative contemporary architecture around Jewish institutions. One such institution, the Jewish Museum Berlin hosted an exhibition, Jewish Identity in Architecture which featured the Cymbalista Synagogue. Earlier international architects had designed synagogues in their signature modern ways: Beth Sholom Congregation (Elkins Park, Pennsylvania) by Frank Lloyd Wright and the proposed redesign of the Hurva Synagogue by Louis Kahn. Mario Botta had designed the building for the San Francisco Museum of Modern Art a few years before and then the Évry Cathedral, with a similar cylindrical shape, just prior. The Cymbalista Synagogue and Jewish Heritage Center was the twelfth and culminating project in a series of religious works by Mario Botta which were shown in London at the Royal Institute of British Architects in an exhibition entitled, Architetture del Sacro: Prayers in Stone.

Details

Notes

External links
Official website
Botta's Official website

Synagogues in Tel Aviv
Tel Aviv University
Round and octagonal synagogues
Brick buildings and structures
Synagogues completed in 1998
1998 establishments in Israel
Mario Botta buildings
Modernist architecture in Israel